The Libera Award for Best Sync Usage is an award presented by the American Association of Independent Music at the annual Libera Award which recognizes "most creative and impactful use of independent music in a film or television or ad campaign" since 2012. The category was known as Best Independent Sync Placement in 2012.

Winners and nominees

Multiple nominations and awards

References

External links

Best Sync Usage